Linden is an unincorporated community in Roane County, West Virginia, United States, along the Henry Fork.  Its elevation is 755 feet (230 m).

The community has the name of Charles Linden Broadus, a Confederate Army officer.

References

Unincorporated communities in Roane County, West Virginia
Unincorporated communities in West Virginia